Black Forest Observatory (BFO) or Observatorium Schiltach is a geophysical observatory owned and operated by Karlsruhe University and Stuttgart University. It is located near Schiltach in the Black Forest region of Baden-Württemberg, in southwest Germany. The observatory is in the Anton mine, which was abandoned and then converted in 1972.

External links
 

Buildings and structures in Baden-Württemberg